The Bad Pack is a 1997 independent action film written and directed by Brent Huff, and starring Robert Davi, Roddy Piper, Ralf Möller, Larry B. Scott, Shawn Huff, and Patrick Dollaghan. The film also stars Brent Huff, Marshall R. Teague, Daniel Zacapa, Bert Rosario, Michael Cole, Robert Swenson and Sven-Ole Thorsen. The Bad Pack was Swenson's last film appearance, as he died of heart failure prior to the film's release.

Plot
A town of Mexican immigrants (on the Texas border) hire a team of mercenaries to protect them against an underground militia group, who try to claim the town as their own.

Cast
 Robert Davi as McQue
 Roddy Piper as Dash Simms
 Ralf Möller as Kurt Mayer (credited as Ralf Moeller)
 Larry B. Scott as Jeremy Britt
 Shawn Huff as Remi Sykes
 Patrick Dollaghan as Latrell Hoffman
 Brent Huff  as Callin
 Marshall R. Teague as Lamont Sperry
 Daniel Zacapa as Hector Chavez
 Bert Rosario as Jose Chavez
 Michael Cole as Fredrickson
 Sven-Ole Thorsen as Sven
 Vernon Wells as Biker
 Cristan Crocker-Reilly as Carmen
 Clifton Collins, Jr. as Townsman 1
 Joe Unger as Fight Promoter
 Robert Swenson as Missouri Mule (final film role)

Reception
The movie was not a big hit and got very poor reviews.

References

1990s action films
1997 films
1990s English-language films